The Glover Hills are prominent hills separating Atka Glacier and Baxter Glacier in the Convoy Range, Victoria Land, Antarctica. They were named by the 1976–77 Victoria University of Wellington Antarctic Expedition, led by Christopher J. Burgess, after Denis Glover, a New Zealand writer, publisher and poet.

References

Hills of Victoria Land
Scott Coast